An Alabama hurricane is a North Atlantic tropical cyclone that affected the U.S. state of Alabama. So far (as of July 2022) 83 tropical and subtropical cyclones have directly or indirectly affected Alabama since HURDAT began in 1851. Only three major hurricanes, the 1926 Miami hurricane, Hurricane Frederic (1979), Hurricane Ivan (2004) and only one off-season storm, Tropical Storm Alberto (2018) has made landfall in Alabama.

Storms

Pre-1900
 August 26, 1852: The Great Mobile Hurricane made landfall in Pascagoula, Mississippi. Later that day, as a Category 1, it moved over Alabama.
 September 11, 1853: A tropical storm made landfall in Pensacola, Florida. After it weakened into a tropical depression, it moved over Alabama.
 September 16, 1859: A hurricane made landfall in Alabama as a Category 1.
 August 12–13, 1860: The 1860 Mississippi hurricane, after making landfall in Mississippi, moved over Alabama as a Category 1.
 September 14–16, 1860: A hurricane landed in Louisiana, as a Category 2. It damaged the coast from landfall to Mobile, Alabama, which lost $1 million in cotton stored on flooded wharves, just a month after the wharves were flooded by the previous hurricane.
 August 17, 1861: A hurricane briefly moved over Alabama.
 November 1, 1861: A tropical storm, while moving over Florida, affected Alabama but does not make a landfall, a direct hit, or moves over it.
 July 8, 1862: A tropical storm's remnants make landfall in Florida and affected Alabama, but weakened into a TD before being able to move over it.
 September 16, 1862: After making landfall in Florida on September 15, a tropical storm moved over Alabama. While doing so, it weakened into a tropical depression.
 July 30, 1870: This Category 1 hurricane made landfall near Mobile, Alabama, although little is known about its origin. Though brief, this storm caused damage along the shores of Mobile Bay, to several steamboats in the Bay, and a floating dry dock broke free and was forced about  up the Mobile River.
 September 19–20, 1877: An eastward-moving Category 1 hurricane passed close to Alabama. The next day, as a tropical storm, it traveled close to the Florida-Alabama border.
 October 16, 1879: After making landfall on the Florida Panhandle, a tropical storm moved over Alabama before dissipating the same day.
 September 1, 1880: After making landfall in Florida, a tropical storm moved over Alabama before dissipating over Mississippi.
 September 10, 1882: After making landfall in Florida, the now-Category-1 1882 Pensacola hurricane moved over Alabama. Right east of the border with Georgia it weakened into a TS.
 August 30–31, 1885: A tropical storm made landfall near Panama City, Florida in the late hours of August 30. Early the next morning, it traveled close to Alabama.
 September 28, 1885: After making landfall near Biloxi, Mississippi, a tropical storm moved over Alabama, near Mobile.
 July 28, 1887: After making landfall in Florida, a weakening Category 1 hurricane moved over Alabama. In the late hours of July 28, it dissipated over Alabama.
 October 20, 1887: The 13th storm in the 1887 Atlantic hurricane season, after making landfall near Biloxi, moved over Alabama, scraping Mobile and Andalusia. That same day, it dissipated over Georgia.
 June 27–28, 1888: A weak tropical storm, though the first to make landfall in the state since 1859, made landfall on the 27th before briefly moving over Florida, and going back into Alabama. On the 28th, it made landfall in Andalusia right before weakening into a TD and dissipating.
 September 23, 1889: Another landfall, this time of Hurricane Six (1889), downgraded to a tropical storm.
 September 13, 1892: After making landfall just east of Pensacola, Tropical Storm Four (1892) weakened into a TD, moved over Alabama, and became extratropical.
 August 8, 1894: Another landfall in Alabama. This time of the 1894 Alabama–Mississippi tropical storm. The landfall in both states caused heavy rain and tornadoes.
 July 8, 1896: The first storm of the 1896 season, after making landfall as a Category 2 in Florida, moved over Alabama for a couple of hours before quickly moving northward.
 August 3, 1898: After making landfall in Florida, a former Category 1 hurricane but now a tropical storm, moved over Alabama and dissipated.

1900s
 September 18, 1901: The 1901 San Vicente hurricane moved over Alabama briefly.
 October 11, 1902: After making landfall in Pensacola, Florida, 1902's Hurricane Four moved over Alabama as a tropical storm.
 November 3, 1904: This was the first storm since HURDAT records began to affect Alabama in the month of November. Tropical Storm Six (1904), after making landfall in Florida, moved east-northeastward, moving over Alabama briefly.
 September 27, 1906:  A category 2 hurricane made landfall in Pascagoula, Mississippi, causing devastating damage to ships, rail lines and structures in Mobile.
 June 29, 1907: A tropical storm made landfall in Florida and affected Alabama.
 August 12, 1911: This was the first storm since 1859 to make landfall in Alabama as a hurricane. After making landfall, the storm (Hurricane Two [1911]) weakened into a tropical storm and crossed the Alabama-Mississippi border.
 July 16–17, 1912: After Tropical Storm Two (1912) made landfall in Georgia, it weakened into a TD and moved over Alabama, hitting Enterprise. Later on July 17, it dissipated.
 September 18, 1914: The first and only tropical storm of that year's Atlantic hurricane season, after making landfall in Georgia, moved over Alabama, Florida, Alabama again, and then dissipated the next day over the Gulf of Mexico.
 October 18, 1916: The storm, Hurricane Fourteen (1916), a Category 2 hurricane, was, at the time, the strongest landfalling Atlantic hurricane in Alabama since HURDAT began in 1851. After making landfall in Alabama, Fourteen moved over Florida, then back into Alabama. While it was there, it caused 11.6 feet of rainfall in Mobile and the highest death toll, 4 deaths. It weakened as it moved further inland. Finally, Fourteen transitioned into an extratropical cyclone in northwestern Tennessee.
 September 29, 1917: The 1917 Nueva Gerona hurricane, at Category 3 intensity, made landfall in Florida, though by the time it reached Alabama, it had weakened into a tropical storm.
 July 5, 1919: Tropical Storm One (1919), after making landfall just east of Pensacola, Florida, moves over Alabama and dissipates the same day.
 October 17, 1922: The remnants of Tropical Storm Five (1922), which by then had weakened into a TD, turned extratropical near Mobile. They continued slightly further north before dissipating in central Alabama.
 June 26, 1923: Tropical Storm One (1923), after making landfall near Biloxi, Mississippi, moved over Alabama. While inland, it weakened into a tropical depression.
 September 21, 1926: This, the first major hurricane landfall recorded in Alabama, was caused by the 1926 Miami hurricane. Originally a Category 4, it made a direct hit (when the eyewall hits land but the eye does not) in Florida before making a true landfall (when the eye hits land) in Alabama, as a Category 3 major hurricane on the Saffir–Simpson scale. The storm produced 18.5 inches of rain in the Bay Minette area and caused extensive damage along the Alabama coast. Weakening into a tropical storm, it moved over Mississippi, hitting Gulfport.
 October 6, 1934: After making landfall just west of Pensacola, Florida, Tropical Storm Eleven (1934) transitioned into an extratropical cyclone and traveled just east of Andalusia before dissipating entirely.
 August 1, 1936: After making landfall on the Florida Panhandle, Hurricane Five (1936) reached Alabama as a minimal Category 1 hurricane. It weakened as it moved further inland (as most storms do) and dissipated that night.
 August 23, 1936: Moving westward across the Gulf Coast, the weak depression that was once Tropical Storm Nine (1936) briefly moved over Alabama.
 August 31 – September 1, 1937: After making landfall in Florida, Tropical Storm Three (1936) moved over Alabama, weakening into a TD just west of Andalusia.
 June 16, 1939: Tropical Storm One (1939) made landfall east of Mobile.
 August 13–17, 1939: Hurricane Two (1939), after making landfall in Florida, weakened into a tropical storm and began to move over Alabama. Later on August 13, it weakened into a TD and began to move very slowly. Finally, on August 18, it reached Tennessee.
 September 11, 1944: Tropical Storm Six (1944) made landfall in Mobile. While moving northeast, it weakened into a TD.
 October 7, 1947: After making landfall in Florida and weakening into a tropical depression, Tropical Storm Seven (1947), labeled as Tropical Storm Item, made landfall in Florida. A tornado was triggered in Jacksonville. As Item weakened into a TD, it moved closer to Alabama, then did a loop and dissipated.
 July 9–11, 1948: An unlabeled tropical storm (later numbered "Two") made landfall in Pensacola, Florida. After doing so, it weakened into a TD and stayed over Alabama until it dissipated.
 August 31, 1950: Hurricane Baker, as a Category 1, made landfall just to the east of Mobile. As it moved further north, a death and two injuries occurred from downed power lines in Birmingham. Additionally, 10.89 inches of rain was recorded.
 September 27, 1953: Hurricane Florence (1953), after making landfall west of Lynn Haven, Florida, weakened into a tropical storm and moved over Alabama briefly. As it passed just south of Dothan, as well as causing 14.71 inches of rain, Florence transitioned into an extratropical cyclone and dissipated over Georgia.
 September 25, 1956: Hurricane Flossy, after making landfall on the Florida Panhandle, moved close to Alabama as a Category 1 hurricane. While doing so, it dropped 10–15 inches of rain in Mobile and Baldwin County.
 September 8, 1957: Tropical Storm Debbie, after making landfall west of Lynn Haven, Florida, moved over Alabama, hitting Dothan. Slightly more northward, it weakened into a TD and began to move over Georgia. 6.81 inches of rain was recorded in Alabama.
 October 8–9, 1959: Tropical Storm Irene made landfall just to the east of Mobile. Moving east-northeast, it weakened into a tropical depression while traveling west of Montgomery. On October 9, Irene dissipated over northern Alabama. Irene brought 3.81 inches of rain to Athens.
 September 26, 1960: The tropical depression remnants of Tropical Storm Florence (1960) made landfall near Mobile, then dissipated. 5.58 inches of rain was recorded in Dothan Municipal Airport.
 October 5, 1964: The extratropical remnants of Hurricane Hilda moved over Alabama for about three hours. They caused 8.91 inches of rain in Alabama.
 June 15, 1965: Tropical Storm One (1965), after making landfall on the Florida Panhandle, very briefly moved over Alabama, before becoming extratropical over Georgia. One caused 6.3 inches of rain in downtown Mobile.
 October 1, 1969: An unnamed subtropical storm (numbered "Subtropical Storm One"), after weakening into a subtropical depression and making landfall in Florida, reached the Florida-Alabama border, and dissipated. One caused 3.38 inches of rainfall in Camden.

 September 23, 1975: The winds caused from Hurricane Eloise were the second major hurricane-force winds on Alabama since HURDAT begun, and fourth-strongest, behind the 1926 Miami hurricane, Hurricane Frederic and Hurricane Ivan. Also, Eloise did not make a direct landfall, but reached Alabama after making landfall in Florida. Even so, 7.67 inches of rain was recorded in Alabama.
 July 19, 1977: An unnumbered tropical depression made landfall east of Mobile before dissipating.
 September 9–14, 1979: Hurricane Frederic was the strongest Atlantic hurricane ever to make landfall in Alabama. 130 mph was its wind speeds and 943 millibars was its pressure when it made landfall in Dauphin Island. Frederic's wind gusts also made history, at 145 mph (later tied by Hurricane Ivan). It had the largest eye ever recorded as well. The record of highest storm surge (12 to 15 feet) in Alabama also goes to Frederic. However, in deaths, which Frederic caused one of, the record goes to 1916's Hurricane Fourteen. 8.55 inches of rainfall occurred in Mobile Regional Airport.
 July 20, 1980: Tropical Depression One (1980), after moving slowly westward, made landfall in Gulfport, Mississippi and dissipated the next day.
 September 2, 1985: After moving along the Gulf of Mexico and near Alabama, while causing a storm surge of 8.5 feet in Dauphin Island, Hurricane Elena made its landfall in Gulfport, Mississippi. However, impact was still left behind in Alabama, like the 3.47 inches of rain falling in Robertsdale.
 October 31 – November 1, 1985: Hurricane Juan, on Halloween, made landfall in Alabama, southeast of Mobile and moved northward, hitting Birmingham and Huntsville. Juan caused 12.23 inches of rain in Fairhope.
 July 4–7, 1994: Tropical Storm Alberto, after making landfall in Florida and weakening into a tropical depression, moved over Alabama for 3 days. In Enterprise, 22.63 inches of rain were recorded.
 August 3, 1995: Hurricane Erin, as a Category 1 hurricane, and after very briefly making landfall in Florida, moved over Alabama, causing 100 homes destroyed and 50–75% of the pecan crop was destroyed. 8.37 inches of rain was recorded in Bay Minnette.
 October 4–5, 1995: Hurricane Opal, after making landfall in Florida, moved over Alabama as a Category 1 hurricane, and passed west of Montgomery as it moved north. Opal is known for its storm surge. Dauphin Island recorded 7 feet of it. Worst of all was the rain. Brewton got 19.42 inches of rain from Opal.
 July 19–22, 1997: Hurricane Danny made the first hurricane-force landfall in Alabama since 1979, as a Category 1 hurricane. It weakened into a tropical storm and moved over Florida. Then Danny began to move over Alabama and weakened into a tropical depression. However, tropical depressions can still cause rain (Tropical Depression Sixteen – 2008) and Danny was among them. Dauphin Island recorded 37.75 inches of rain. Mobile County recorded 43 inches. Danny caused 4 deaths, and, according to the NHC, it caused $100 million worth of damage in Alabama alone.
 September 29, 1998: Hurricane Georges makes landfall in Biloxi, Mississippi as a Category 2, then moved eastward, over Alabama, as a tropical depression. However, tropical depressions can still cause rain (Tropical Depression Sixteen – 2008) and Georges was among them. It caused 29.66 inches of rain in Bay Minette. Georges caused a 7–11 foot storm surge in Mobile and Baldwin counties and caused extensive damage along the coast, especially in Bayou La Batre and on Dauphin Island.

2000s

 September 22, 2000: Tropical Storm Helene, after making landfall in Florida, weakened into a tropical depression and moved briefly over Alabama before reaching Georgia.
 June 11–12, 2001: After making landfall in Mississippi, Tropical Storm Allison moved over Alabama as a tropical depression before reaching Georgia. 11.36 inches of rain was recorded in Fairhope.
 August 6, 2001: After making landfall on the Florida Panhandle, Tropical Storm Barry weakened into a tropical depression and moved over Alabama. 4.57 inches of rain were recorded in  Evergreen.
 September 16–17, 2004: As a Category 3 hurricane, Hurricane Ivan made landfall in Alabama. Ivan was only the third major hurricane ever to hit Alabama. As it moved inland, it quickly weakened; however, it later regenerated. When it made landfall, it made a "historic" storm surge. Ivan brought 10.16 inches of rain to Silver Hill.
 June 11–12, 2005: Tropical Storm Arlene made landfall at the Florida-Alabama border. As it moved inland, it weakened into a tropical depression. On June 12, it moved into Mississippi. 6.77 inches of rain were recorded in Alabama.
 July 11, 2005: Hurricane Dennis, after making landfall in Florida as a Category 3 hurricane, moved over Alabama as a tropical storm for a few hours. However, the rainfall was intense. 12.8 inches of rain (325 mm) was recorded in Camden.
 August 28–30, 2005: Hurricane Katrina caused 2 deaths and tropical storm-force winds in Alabama. Mobile Bay spilled into Mobile. Katrina brought 6.59 inches of rainfall to Alabama. For other effects, see the article Effects of Hurricane Katrina in Alabama.
 September 22, 2007: After making landfall in Florida, Tropical Depression Ten moved over Alabama and dissipated west of Mobile. Ten caused 3.05 inches of rain in Brewton.
 August 24–26, 2008: Tropical Depression Fay, after making landfall in Florida, erratically moved along Alabama. For a short time on August 25, it moved into Mississippi. On August 27, it turned extratropical in eastern Tennessee. 12.74 inches of rain was recorded in Alabama.
 August 17, 2009: The remnants of Tropical Storm Claudette, after making landfall on the Florida Panhandle, moved over Alabama as a tropical depression. Claudette caused minimal impact in Alabama and dissipated late that day. Claudette also brought 3.69 inches of rain in Alabama.
 November 10, 2009: The beginning of the extratropical cyclone that would become known as "Nor'Ida", which formed from the remnants of Hurricane Ida, made landfall in Dauphin Island, Alabama and later in mainland Alabama before moving into Florida. Ida also made the most landfalls in Alabama, 2. 9.83 inches of rain were recorded in Opelika.
 May 29, 2018: After Tropical Storm Alberto made landfall in Florida, it weakened into a TD and quickly moved over Alabama. 8.07 inches of rain were recorded in Cloverdale.
 September 16, 2020: Hurricane Sally made landfall near Gulf Shores, Alabama, causing significant inundation. Sally also became the first tropical cyclone to truly make landfall in Alabama since Ivan.
October 29, 2020: Hurricane Zeta made landfall near New Orleans, Louisiana. Wind gusts of 91 mph were recorded in Mobile, Alabama causing widespread damage and power outages.
June 18, 2021: Tropical Storm Claudette passed through Alabama as a tropical depression, spawning tornadoes and killing 14 people.
June 29, 2021: The remnants of Tropical Storm Danny brought mild rainstorms to Alabama.

Listed by month

See also

 List of United States hurricanes

Notes

References

 
Hurricanes
Alabama